Healing Is a Miracle is the fourth studio album by American musician Julianna Barwick. It was released on July 10, 2020 under Ninja Tune.

Singles
On May 20, 2020, Barwick announced the release of her new album, along with the first single "Inspirit". The second single "In Light", which features Sigur Rós lead singer Jónsi, was released on June 18, 2020.

Critical reception

Healing Is a Miracle was met with "generally favorable" reviews from critics. At Metacritic, which assigns a weighted average rating out of 100 to reviews from mainstream publications, this release received an average score of 79, based on 13 reviews. Aggregator albumoftheyear.org gave the album 76 out of 100 based on a critical consensus of 14 reviews.

Accolades 
The album appeared in several best-albums-of-2020 yearend lists, including those published by Drowned in Sound, The Line of Best Fit, Crack Magazine, musicOMH, Paste, Gorilla vs. Bear, Our Culture, The Vinyl Factory, Uncut, Noisey.com, God Is in the TV, AllMusic and The New Yorker.

Track listing
Track listing adapted from Tidal

Personnel
 Julianna Barwick – vocals , producer 
 Mary Lattimore – vocals 
 Jónsi – vocals 
 Nosaj Thing – vocals 
 Heba Kadry – mixing & mastering , engineer

References

2020 albums
Julianna Barwick albums
Ninja Tune albums